"I Know What I Like (In Your Wardrobe)" was the first charting single by the rock band Genesis. It was drawn from their 1973 album Selling England by the Pound. The single was released in the UK in February 1974, and became a minor hit in April 1974, when it reached number 21 in the UK Singles Chart.

Production 

The song's lyrics concern a young man, Jacob, who is employed as a groundsman and who says that he does not want to grow up and do great things, being perfectly happy where he is, pushing a lawn mower. Betty Swanwick's painting The Dream, which was used for the Selling England album cover, alludes to the song; Swanwick added the mower to the original painting at the band's request.

The song, inspired by the Beatles, has a psychedelic rock sound, using hand percussion rhythms and a riff from Steve Hackett that originated from a jam between Hackett and Phil Collins. Keyboardist Tony Banks used a note played on the low end of the Mellotron during the intro and ending to imitate the sound of a lawn mower.

Reviewing the song in The Guardian in 2014, Stevie Chick said "Clocking in at a shade over four minutes, "I Know What I Like" rises with a heat-haze shimmer, before locking into a groove akin to Traffic’s "Hole in My Shoe", a hippy reverie that fits the song’s slacker vibe like a pair of tailored bell-bottoms. The song’s anti-hero is a misfit, like all the others in the Gabriel-era songbook, a drop-out happy with his lawnmowing life, despite the disapproving whispers of his suburban neighbours. His rebellion is soundtracked by a nagging, lazy sitar lick, a woozy singalong chorus, and a flute solo that Pan's People doubtless interpreted through the medium of dance when the song appeared on Top Of The Pops after reaching No 21 in the charts."

B-side production 
Twilight Alehouse, the B-side, was originally developed by the band somewhere between 1970 and 1971, being played in live shows since the Nursery Cryme era. Twilight Alehouse was a live favorite, but a 1972 concert in Belgium is the only recorded footage of the song being played live.

Twilight Alehouse was also played during the Nursery Cryme, Foxtrot, and Selling England by the Pound Tours before never being played again. This fully developed version has been re-released and changed many times, with one version on a rare Charisma Records anniversary LP only released in Italy, containing a version of Twilight Alehouse without the flute intro and a un-released version of "Watcher of the Skies".

The song itself, at almost 8 minutes long, starts with the tale of a man who drinks to forget his sorrow, which then segues at 5:15 into an extended instrumental ending.

Release and reception 
Released by Charisma in the UK in February 1974, "I Know What I Like" was the band's only pop hit of their early years, at a time when progressive rock bands largely avoided the singles market. The song was played on Top of the Pops. Its success would not be topped until And Then There Were Three album's "Follow You Follow Me", some four years later in 1978.

The B-side was the non-album track "Twilight Alehouse", recorded during the sessions for Foxtrot (1972) but left off the album due to lack of room. Its lyrics portray a lonely man who finds solace in the local tavern. The song had been in Genesis' live set since 1970 but was not recorded in the studio until 1972 during the Foxtrot sessions, and its initial release was held until this point. "Twilight Alehouse" was later released as part of Genesis Archive 1967–75.

Live performance 
Later live versions of this song (such as the one on Seconds Out) feature an extended instrumental section which includes snippets of various other Genesis songs – such as "Visions of Angels", "Blood on the Rooftops", "Dancing with the Moonlit Knight" and "Stagnation" – and songs by other artists, such as "Don't Let Me Be Misunderstood". In the version on "The Way We Walk", snippets include "Follow You Follow Me", "That's All", "Illegal Alien" and "Your Own Special Way".  Phil Collins performed a dance during these instrumentals, using a tambourine in a tight, rhythmic fashion against his hands, elbows, knees, feet, buttocks and head; this can seen in the Genesis: In Concert film from 1977, as well as the live DVDs The Way We Walk – Live in Concert (1992) and When in Rome 2007.  In his memoir Not Dead Yet, Collins describes the dance as "a cross between morris dancing and John Cleese's The Ministry of Silly Walks".

For The Way We Walk and Turn It On Again tours, this song was played as part of a medley of old Genesis songs, and starting with the A Trick of the Tail tour in 1976 was often performed with excerpts of "Stagnation", from the album Trespass (1970). During the Turn It On Again tour shows, images from the band's history cycled by in the background.

Cover versions 
In 1993, Marillion's ex-frontman Fish did a cover version on his Songs from the Mirror album. Fish said his decision to cover the song was to prove to his critics that he could interpret a song differently from Gabriel, having been previously dismissed in his career as a Gabriel clone.

Personnel 
 Peter Gabriel – lead vocal, flute, percussion
 Tony Banks – Hammond organ, ARP Pro Soloist synthesizer, Mellotron
 Steve Hackett – electric guitar
 Mike Rutherford – bass guitar, electric sitar
 Phil Collins – drums, assorted percussion, harmony vocals

Cultural references
The presenters of Top Gear and The Grand Tour have mixed views on the song, particularly between Jeremy Clarkson and Richard Hammond with Clarkson being a fan of Genesis and Hammond expressing a dislike of the group's music. The song subsequently became a recurring gag during the show following the Middle East Special in which Clarkson inserted a hidden speaker in Hammond's car playing the track on a loop. In Top Gear's India Special, Clarkson played the song through a megaphone attachment on his car to annoy Hammond and played the song  in an unsuccessful attempt to get Hammond out of the way whilst racing towards finshing point in Top Gear: African Special.

References 

Sources
 .

Genesis (band) songs
1974 singles
Songs written by Peter Gabriel
Songs written by Mike Rutherford
Songs written by Phil Collins
Songs written by Tony Banks (musician)
Songs written by Steve Hackett
1973 songs
Charisma Records singles
Atlantic Records singles
British psychedelic rock songs